Sunnydale is a private school located in Dhaka, Bangladesh. It uses English as the medium of instruction but puts equal emphasis in Bengali. It offers preschool to A-Level courses.

Sunnydale was founded by Late Abdul Mannan Khan, Zeenat Afroza and Tazeen Ahmed in 1985. It started with a few children and one room at Road-7, Dhanmondi. The 3500sq ft house was the paternal home of Co-founder Zeenat Afroza. Currently there are over a thousand students and over a hundred faculty members in the school. The aim of Sunnydale is "not only to educate the children but also to help them develop into confident and independent individuals".

Curriculum

Sunnydale offers primary, secondary, and high school programs leading to the GCE examinations which are conducted by the British Council. Till 2009, Sunnydale's O-level and A-Level examinations were held under Edexcel Examination board. Since 2009, Sunnydale's O-level and A-level examination has been administered by Cambridge International Examinations.
In order to be well prepared to start the Ordinary Level syllabus in Grade IX, the whole curriculum from Grade I to Grade VIII is designed in such a systematic and methodical way that strives to develop the intellectual, creative and physical abilities of a child needed in each class till Advanced Level.

Laboratory

Sunnydale has science laboratories which are up to the standard required for O-Level and A-level examinations. It also has computer laboratories in the Middle Sections and Senior Section, where students learn project work.

Library

Sunnydale always encourages its students to read books along with their textbooks. To ensure this, the school has libraries full of interesting books appropriate for all ages. It includes famous book series' like Harry Potter, Percy Jackson, Sherlock Holmes etc.
However, the libraries also hold various books from iconic authors such as Alistair Maclean and Stephen King for the senior classes.
It also has story books. Since a great emphasis is put on Bengali, the libraries also have a huge variety of Bengali books.

References

External links
 
 Sunnydale champs

Dhanmondi
Educational institutions established in 1985
1985 establishments in Bangladesh